Calophasidia cana is a moth in the family Noctuidae. It is endemic to the Northern Territory, Queensland and Western Australia.

External links
Australian Moths Online
Australian Faunal Directory

Hadeninae
Moths described in 1939